The discography of Spanish recording artist Aitana consists of two studio albums, one compilation album, one extended play, twelve singles, and one promotional single.

Albums

Studio albums

Compilation albums

Video releases

Extended plays

Singles

As lead artist

Notes

Promotional singles

Other charted songs

Music videos

References 

Discographies of Spanish artists